Juha Harju (born 1981 in Kuopio) is a Finnish heavy metal musician. He was the vocalist of the Finnish dark metal/black metal band Shade Empire and dark-metal band Chaosweaver (Cypher Commander). He also plays bass in black metal bands Ajattara (under the alias Tohtori Kuolio) and Deathchain (under the alias Kuolio). He has named Ozzy Osbourne and Chuck Schuldiner as his favourite musicians.

References 

1981 births
Living people
People from Kuopio
Finnish heavy metal musicians
Finnish heavy metal singers
21st-century Finnish male singers